Trumpet Concerto may refer to:

 Trumpet concerto, a concerto for solo trumpet and instrumental ensemble
 Trumpet Concerto (Arutiunian)
 Trumpet Concerto (Davies)
 Trumpet Concerto (Haydn)
 Trumpet Concerto (Hummel)
 Trumpet Concerto (Leopold Mozart)
 Trumpet Concerto (Michael Haydn)
 Trumpet Concerto (Mozart)